Adèle Wilhelmina Weman (October 7, 1844 – September 10, 1936) was a Finnish writer and educator. She wrote in Swedish under the pen names Parus Ater, Inga Storm and Zakarias. She was a pioneer in the fields of youth education and the development of youth associations.

The daughter of Johan Wilhelm Weman, a land surveyor, and Carolina Wilhelmina Granbohm, she was born in Valkeala. In 1882, she began teaching at the college in Kimito and she retired from teaching in 1917.

Her first children's book Efter lexan följer leken: berättelser och lekar was published in 1844 under the name Parus Ater. It was followed by Barnafröjd: versifierade lekar och berättelser in 1899. She also wrote for various newspapers and magazines and published plays and poetry.

Weman died in Kimito at the age of 91.

Parus Ater is the Latin name for the coal tit.

Selected works 
 En byhistorie, folk stories (as Parus Ater) (1883)
 På landsbygden, folk stories (as Parus Ater) (1885)
 Uppåt eller nedåt?, novel (as Inge Storm) (1890)
 Läsförhörskalaset i Hultnäs, play (1914)

References 

1844 births
1936 deaths
Finnish women novelists
Finnish children's writers
Finnish women children's writers
Finnish educators
Swedish-speaking Finns
19th-century Finnish educators
20th-century Finnish educators
20th-century Finnish novelists
19th-century Finnish novelists
20th-century women writers
19th-century women writers
Pseudonymous women writers
19th-century pseudonymous writers
20th-century pseudonymous writers